Demba Souleymane Traoré (born 22 April 1982) is a Swedish football striker/midfielder who plays for Lyn.

Career
Traoré was born in Stockholm with a father from Mali and a mother from Finland.

Troaré made his first team debut at the age of 18 with Cambridge United against Bristol City in the 2000–01 Football League Second Division. The next season Traoré made his first start for the club, in the league opener at the Abbey Stadium against Brighton & Hove Albion. Traoré was chosen as Man of the Match.

In 2004 Traoré returned to the Swedish club Vasalund/Essinge IF. While playing for Vasalund/Essing IF in Division 2 Östra Svealand, Traoré finished as the league's top scorer with 13 goals and was chosen as the league's best attacker in the 2004–2005 season.

Traoré later played for the Greek clubs Panetolikos F.C. and Apollon Kalamarias in the Beta Ethniki. Due to the club's economic problems, Traoré left on a free transfer with six months left on the contract and was signed by Fortuna Sittard on 7 August 2009. He made his debut the same day when his new club lost 4–0 against Helmond Sport. Traoré scored his first hat-trick in his third game for Fortuna Sittard, when HFC Haarlem was beaten 5–1 on 21 August.

In the end of March 2011, Traoré signed a one-year contract with Nybergsund IL-Trysil in Norway. Traoré scored his first goal for the club in an away game against Mjøndalen IF on 10 April 2011. 2012 Traoré extended his contract with the club for one more year. He ended the season scoring 10 goals playing first half of the season as a center-forward and the second half at the right-wing. 2013 Traoré signed a new contract for another year. He moved from playing as centre-forward to a center-back position for the first time in his career. He was also given the Captain's armband.

Ahead of the 2014 season he joined Asker Fotball. He left the club again at the end of 2018.

On 18 February 2019, Traoré joined Lyn Fotball.

References

1982 births
Living people
Footballers from Stockholm
Swedish footballers
Swedish people of Malian descent
Swedish people of Finnish descent
AIK Fotboll players
Vasalunds IF players
Cambridge United F.C. players
Enfield F.C. players
Panetolikos F.C. players
Apollon Pontou FC players
Fortuna Sittard players
Eerste Divisie players
Nybergsund IL players
Norwegian First Division players
Norwegian Second Division players
Asker Fotball players
Lyn Fotball players
Expatriate footballers in England
Expatriate footballers in Greece
Expatriate footballers in the Netherlands
Swedish expatriate footballers
Expatriate footballers in Norway
Swedish expatriate sportspeople in Norway
Swedish expatriate sportspeople in England
Swedish expatriate sportspeople in Greece
Swedish expatriate sportspeople in the Netherlands
Swedish expatriate sportspeople in the United Kingdom
Association football forwards